The AT&T Building is a 265 ft (81 m), 16-story skyscraper in Downtown Omaha, Nebraska, United States. It was the tallest structure in downtown Omaha until the Woodmen Tower and later First National Bank Tower surpassed it in height. The original 15 story building was built in 1918, a twelve-story addition was added on the north end in 1957 and another on the west end in 1964. An additional story was added in 1970 to bring it to sixteen stories.  It was home to The Northwestern Bell headquarters until 1991 when US West merged its three Bell Operating Companies.  The building is now used for CenturyLink's Omaha operations.

See also
 Economy of Omaha, Nebraska
 List of tallest buildings in Omaha, Nebraska

References 
 

Skyscraper office buildings in Omaha, Nebraska
Building (Omaha)